"I've Got Bonnie" is a song written by Gerry Goffin and Carole King, which was released by Bobby Rydell in 1962. The song spent 11 weeks on the Billboard Hot 100 chart, peaking at No. 18, while reaching No. 5 on Canada's CHUM Hit Parade along with the b-side "Lose Her".

Chart performance

References

1962 songs
1962 singles
Bobby Rydell songs
Cameo Records singles
Songs with lyrics by Gerry Goffin
Songs written by Carole King